Amy Douglass (December 21, 1902 – March 5, 1980) was an American actress.

Her works as a film actress include The Unsinkable Molly Brown (1964), Duel (1971), Close Encounters of the Third Kind (1977). She also worked on television, appearing in episodes of 77 Sunset Strip and Ben Casey among others.

Biography
Douglass was born in Mansfield (Ohio) in 1902. She began her acting career in 1950, appearing on television in episodes of Actors Studio, Suspicion, The Thin Man and Alfred Hitchcock Presents during the 1950s and in Please Don't Eat the Daisies, Dennis the Menace, Stoney Burke and Thriller during the 1960s.

She also appeared in films like The Unsinkable Molly Brown as Mrs. Fitzgerald, in Duel as an old woman in car and in Close Encounters of the Third Kind as Implantee.

Douglass died in Los Angeles, California, on March 5, 1980.

Selected filmography

Film
 Please Don't Eat the Daisies (1960) - Martha (uncredited)
 Where the Boys Are (1960) - Dr. Raunch (uncredited)
 All in a Night's Work (1961) - Dowager (uncredited)
 Ada (1961) - Mrs. Bradville (uncredited)
 The Unsinkable Molly Brown (1964) - Mrs. Fitzgerald
 Duel (1971, TV Movie) - Old Woman in Car
 Close Encounters of the Third Kind (1977) - Implantee #1 (final film role)

Television
 Actors Studio (1950) - (uncredited)
 Suspicion (1958) - Jean - Markham's Secretary
 The Thin Man (1959) - Lucy Van Horn
 Alfred Hitchcock Presents (1959) - Mrs. Logan
 Dennis the Menace (1960) - Mrs. Toland
 Window on Main Street (1961) - Grandma – episode "The Haunted House"
 77 Sunset Strip (1962) - Mrs. Gray
 Thriller (1962) - Mrs. Carson
 Ben Casey (1962)
 Stoney Burke (1963) - Miss Sherry
 The Invaders (1967) - Mrs. Wilk

References

External links
 
 

1902 births
1980 deaths
American film actresses
American television actresses
People from Mansfield, Ohio
20th-century American actresses